Red flag may refer to:

 Red flag (idiom), a metaphor for something signalling a problem 
 Red flag warning, a term used by meteorologists
 Red flag (battle ensign), maritime flag signaling an intention to give battle with no quarter (fight to the death)
 Red flag (racing), used in auto racing when conditions are too dangerous to continue the session

Politics
 Red flag (politics), a symbol of socialism, communism or left-wing politics
 Red Flag (magazine), a major political journal published by the Chinese Communist Party
 Red Flag Party, a communist party in Venezuela
 Peruvian Communist Party – Red Flag, a communist party in Peru
 "The Red Flag", a left-wing protest song written by Irishman Jim Connell in 1889
 Red Flag (newspaper), an Australian left-wing newspaper published by Socialist Alternative
 Shimbun Akahata (Newspaper Red Flag), the newspaper of the Japanese Communist Party
Red Banner
 Flag of the Soviet Union, known as "The Red Banner"

Law
 Red flag law, a law that allows the temporary confiscation of firearms from a person deemed a risk to others or to themselves
 Red flag traffic laws
 Red Flag Act, properly, Locomotives Act 1865, the 19th-century British road law
 Red Flags Rule created by the Federal Trade Commission (FTC) to help prevent identity theft

Military
 Exercise Red Flag (also called "Operation Red Flag"), a series of military training exercises
 Red Flag – Alaska, a USAF military training exercise conducted in Alaska

Film and TV
 "Red Flag" (Jericho)
 Red Flag, television series characters in Alphas
 Red Flag: The Ultimate Game, a 1981 TV movie starring Barry Bostwick
 "Red Flag", an episode of the television documentary series People's Century

Music
 Red Flag (band), a synthpop band founded in 1984
 Red Flag (album), a 2016 album by All Saints

Songs
 The Red Flag, anthem of the British Labour Party
 "Red Flag Day", song from U2 album Songs of Experience
 Red Flag (Italian song) "Bandiera Rossa", one of the most famous songs of the Italian labour movement
 "Red Flag" (song), a song by Billy Talent from Billy Talent II
 "Red Flags" (song), a 2023 song by Mimi Webb
 The Standard of Revolt (French: Le drapeau rouge), a French socialist song
 "Red Flag", a song from Slipknot's album We Are Not Your Kind

Other uses
 A red flag is used by a coach to signal a replay review in gridiron football
 Red flags are sometimes used (less often than in the past) on rail transport in Great Britain and Ireland by railway guards as a signal to engine drivers that they must not proceed.
 Red Flag (automobile), or FAW Hongqi, a luxury limousine made by First Automobile Works in China from the late 1950s
 Red Flag Linux, the Chinese Linux distribution
 Red Flag Publishing House, a book publisher based in China

See also
 Bandera Roja (La Paz), a socialist newspaper in Bolivia of the 1920s
 Die Rote Fahne (The Red Flag), a German communist newspaper created on 9 November 1918 by Karl Liebknecht and Rosa Luxemburg
 Hongqi (disambiguation), Hongqi means Red Flag in Chinese
 Jolly Roger, which is sometimes incorrectly thought to stem from the French term Joli rouge (for Pretty Red flag)